Escharella is a genus of bryozoans belonging to the family Escharellidae.

The genus has almost cosmopolitan distribution.

Species:

Escharella abyssicola 
Escharella acuta 
Escharella anatirostris 
Escharella ansata 
Escharella areolata
Escharella ashapurae 
Escharella bensoni 
Escharella capitata 
Escharella connectens 
Escharella crozetensis 
Escharella cryptooecium 
Escharella cycloris 
Escharella diaphana 
Escharella dijmphnae 
Escharella discors 
Escharella elongata 
Escharella fistula 
Escharella fusca 
Escharella gilsoni 
Escharella granulosa 
Escharella grossa 
Escharella grotriani 
Escharella guernei 
Escharella hexagonalis 
Escharella hoernesi 
Escharella hozawai 
Escharella immersa 
Escharella incudifera 
Escharella indivisa 
Escharella klugei 
Escharella labiata 
Escharella labiosa 
Escharella lagaaiji 
Escharella laqueata 
Escharella latodonta 
Escharella levinseni 
Escharella longicella 
Escharella longicollis 
Escharella lopezfei 
Escharella macrodonta 
Escharella mamillata 
Escharella modica 
Escharella nilotica 
Escharella obscura 
Escharella octodentata 
Escharella ovalis 
Escharella ovoidea 
Escharella patens 
Escharella praealta 
Escharella quadrata 
Escharella reussiana 
Escharella rogeri 
Escharella rugosa 
Escharella rylandi 
Escharella selseyensis 
Escharella serratilabris 
Escharella spinosissima 
Escharella takatukii 
Escharella tenera 
Escharella teres 
Escharella thompsoni 
Escharella trispinosa 
Escharella uncifera 
Escharella variolosa 
Escharella ventricosa 
Escharella vigneauxi 
Escharella watersi

References

Bryozoan genera